Cheshmeh Sefid-e Aqabeygi (also Romanized as Cheshmeh Sefīd-e Āqābeygī) is a village in Haft Ashiyan Rural District, Kuzaran District, Kermanshah County, Kermanshah Province, Iran. At the 2006 census, its population was 14, in 5 families.

References 

Populated places in Kermanshah County